A half-carry flag (also known as an auxiliary flag) is a condition flag bit in the status register of many CPU families, such as the Intel 8080, Zilog Z80, the x86, and the Atmel AVR series, among others. It indicates when a carry or borrow has been generated out of the least significant four bits of the accumulator register following the execution of an arithmetic instruction. It is primarily used in decimal (BCD) arithmetic instructions.

Usage 

Normally, a processor that utilizes binary arithmetic (which includes almost all modern CPUs) will add two 8-bit byte values according to the rules of simple binary addition. For example, adding 25 and 48 produces 6D. However, for binary-coded decimal (BCD) values, where each 4-bit nibble represents a decimal digit, addition is more complicated. For example, adding the decimal value 25 and 48, which are encoded as the BCD values 25 and 48, the binary addition of the two values produces 6D. Since the lower nibble of this value is a non-decimal digit (D), it must be adjusted by adding 06 to produce the correct BCD result of 73, which represents the decimal value 73.

   0010 0101   25
 + 0100 1000   48
 -----------
   0110 1101   6D, intermediate result
 +      0110   06, adjustment
 -----------
   0111 0011   73, adjusted result

Likewise, adding the BCD values 39 and 48 produces 81. This result does not have a non-decimal low nibble, but it does cause a carry out of the least significant digit (lower four bits) into the most significant digit (upper four bits). This is indicated by the CPU setting the half-carry flag. This value must also be corrected, by adding 06 to 81 to produce a corrected BCD result of 87.

   0011 1001   39
 + 0100 1000   48
 -----------
   1000 0001   81, intermediate result
 +      0110   06, adjustment
 -----------
   1000 0111   87, adjusted result

Finally, if an addition results in a non-decimal high digit, then 60 must be added to the value to produce the correct BCD result. For example, adding 72 and 73 produces E5. Since the most significant digit of this sum is non-decimal (E), adding 60 to it produces a corrected BCD result of 145. (Note that the leading 1 digit is actually a carry bit.)

   0111 0010   72
 + 0111 0011   73
 -----------
   1110 0101   E5, intermediate result
 + 0110        60, adjustment
 -----------
 1 0100 0101  145, adjusted result

Summarizing, if the result of a binary addition contains a non-decimal low digit or causes the half-carry flag to be set, the result must be corrected by adding 06 to it; if the result contains a non-decimal high digit, the result must be further corrected by adding 60 to produce the correct final BCD value.

The Auxiliary Carry Flag in x86 

The Auxiliary Carry Flag (AF) is a CPU flag in the FLAGS register of all x86-compatible CPUs, and the preceding 8080-family.
It has occasionally been called the Adjust Flag by Intel. The flag bit is located at position 4 in the CPU flag register. It indicates when an arithmetic carry or borrow has been generated out of the four least significant bits, or lower nibble. It is primarily used to support binary-coded decimal (BCD) arithmetic.

The Auxiliary Carry flag is set (to 1) if during an "add" operation there is a carry from the low nibble (lowest four bits) to the high nibble (upper four bits), or a borrow from the high nibble to the low nibble, in the low-order 8-bit portion, during a subtraction. Otherwise, if no such carry or borrow occurs, the flag is cleared or "reset" (set to 0).

See also 
 Carry flag
 Intel BCD opcode
 Half-carry flag

References 

Binary arithmetic
Computer arithmetic
X86 architecture